The Palace is a British drama television series that aired on ITV in 2008. Produced by Company Pictures for the ITV network, it was created by Tom Grieves and follows a fictional British Royal Family in the aftermath of the death of King James III and the succession of his 24-year-old son, King Richard IV, played by Rupert Evans. It also stars Jane Asher and Zoe Telford. The series was filmed on location in Lithuania in 2007 and broadcast from 14 January to 3 March 2008. Low viewing figures cancelled it after one series.

Plot
On the sudden death of King James III, his 24-year-old elder son inherits the throne and becomes Richard IV. Princess Eleanor (Sophie Winkleman), his older sister, wants the throne for herself and resents that it goes to Richard. Her Private Secretary, Major Simon Brooks (David Harewood), helps her try to discredit the new king. Richard's younger brother, Prince George (Sebastian Armesto), is a party-animal, and the youngest sister, Princess Isabelle (Nathalie Lunghi), is an A-Level student. Their mother is the now-widowed Queen Charlotte (Jane Asher).

Abigail Thomas (Zoe Telford) is Richard's secretary who plans to write a tell-all book about her life in the Palace. Richard's Private Secretary is Sir Iain Ratalick (Roy Marsden). Other staff featured in the series are Abigail's personal assistant Lucy Bedford (Fiona Button) and the Press Secretary Jonty Roberts (Lorcan Cranitch).

Cast
 Rupert Evans as King Richard IV
 Jane Asher as Queen Charlotte
 Sophie Winkleman as Princess Eleanor
 Sebastian Armesto as Prince George
 Nathalie Lunghi as Princess Isabelle
 Roy Marsden as Sir Iain Ratalick
 Zoe Telford as Abigail Thomas
 David Harewood as Major Simon Brooks
 Lorcan Cranitch as Jonty Roberts
 Hugh Ross as Jeremy Robinson
 John Ramm as Chief Superintendent Peter Bayfield
 Fiona Button as Lucy Bedford
 Shelley Conn as Miranda Hill
 John Shrapnel as PM Edward Shaw
 Christine Bottomley as Natalie
 Clemency Burton-Hill as The Hon. Alice Templeton
 Anton Lesser as Archbishop of Canterbury
 John Benfield as Ray Mellor
 Laura Haddock as Lady Arabella Worthesley Wolsey
 Dominic Jephcott as Dr Philip Hooper
 Frank Mills as Jack 'Dobbsy' Dobbs
 James Thornton as Milton Bishop
 Harriet Walter as Joanna Woodward
 Huw Rhys as David Waverley
 Owain Arthur as Jimmy Clacy
 Kate O'Flynn as Ruby Riley
 Russell Bright as Neil Haslam
 Heather Tobias as Anne Featherstone
 Amit Shah as Kulvinder 'Vinny' Ganatra
  as King James III

Episodes
The Palace aired on Mondays at 9 p.m. Each episode is about 45 minutes long and originally aired in a 60-minute slot with adverts. The broadcasts were sponsored by Warner Leisure Hotels, both on television and on itv.com. International broadcast sales were handled by All3Media, Company Pictures' parent company.

Production
Tom Grieves' initial pitch centred on "a woman operating within the shadow of power". Ideas for the "power" included the Prime Minister, Sir Mick Jagger, and Rupert Murdoch before he settled on a fictional royal family. The relationship between the woman and the royal family was modelled on that seen in The West Wing between Jed Bartlet and his staff; Grieves desired to mimic The West Wing "talky, aspirational, sophisticated" style in his own series. The earliest summaries of the plot placed the focus of the series on a woman who is working undercover at Buckingham Palace with the intent of writing an exposé of the King's life. The woman (later named "Abigail") "goes native" and cancels her book because she falls for the King.

The series was written by Grieves, Chris Lang, Charlotte Jones, and Toby Whitehouse. Grieves was influenced in his writing by Hamlet; he explored how Richard deals with the "ancient, ritualistic institution" that he inherits after James dies. The writers deliberately avoided making comparisons to the real royal family, despite the links made by media between Richard and George to Princes William and Harry. Patrick Jephson, the former private secretary to Diana, Princess of Wales, was consulted extensively during production, working with the writing team for over a year. The series was greenlit by ITV in January 2007.

Sets were designed by Taff Batley. Batley scouted production locations in Hungary, due to the expense a production the size of The Palace would have if filmed in the UK. A site was eventually found near the dock in Vilnius, Lithuania. Exterior sets of Buckingham Palace were scaled down from their true counterparts because of the length of time full-sized replicas would take to create; the scale sets alone took ten weeks to build. Red gravel for the palace courtyard was mimicked using clay that was bound for a new tennis court under construction nearby. Interior sets were built in an ice skating rink on the other side of the city. They used plasterboard instead of the lighter, cheaper plywood that would have been used on a British-based set. Batley referred to documentary footage to find a basis for his designs of bedrooms and other private areas of the palace that would otherwise not be available for public viewing. The first block of four episodes was directed by Metin Hüseyin and the second by Maurice Phillips.

Reception
Prior to the broadcast of the series the pressure group Mediawatch UK called it "tawdry and offensive", suggesting that viewers would confuse the scripted television characters with the real British royal family. Lord St John of Fawsley called it "very near to the bone" and Penny Junor, the biographer of Charles, Prince of Wales, suggested ITV is exploiting the royal family by presenting fiction as fact. The Guardian previewed it as one of the top 50 shows (including film, theatre and television) to watch over the Christmas period.

After the first episode aired, Nancy Banks-Smith said in The Guardian that The Palace "is the TV equivalent of balloon modelling. It feels like being shot to death with popcorn." She also said that "I never fail to be amazed when decent actors - Walter, Marsden, Cranitch, Shrapnel - bob up in tosh like this." Andrew Billen said in The Times "I am delighted that, as with The Palace, the channel is setting before us something other than a grim regional detective or a comedy drama about suburban adultery. The Palace inhabits an incredible world all of its own. In that respect it is believable: the real palace undoubtedly does, too." James Walton for The Daily Telegraph wrote that for "sheer weirdness" there "was no match at all for The Palace". Keith Watson wrote in the Metro said that The Palace "pitched itself just right, its tongue-in-cheek study of a faction-riven upstairs clan contrasting with the bitching and backbiting of the downstairs footmen." He concluded his review by saying "Much of The Palace may be playing for laughs but it promises a sting in its blue-blooded tale".

The day after the series ended, Watson wrote "I know I'm in a minority here, but I shall miss the Dynasty-style antics of King Rich and his nemesis Princess Eleanor, with Rupert Evans and Sophie Winkleman top hole as scheming royal siblings." Rupert Evans played a very convincing, young King, with all the right flares.  Watson called the series a victim of "ITV1’s ratings-crazy drama cull", referring to its impending cancellation.

In April 2008, ITV announced that The Palace would not be renewed for a second series, due to low viewing figures. The last episode had been watched by 3.1 million people.

DVD release
The Palace was released on DVD in the UK (Region 2) on 17 March 2008.

Notes

1. Ratings for these episodes fell below the Top 30 most-viewed programmes; BARB does not publicly release these figures.

References

External links
 
 The Palace at Company Pictures
 

2008 British television series debuts
2008 British television series endings
2000s British drama television series
ITV television dramas
English-language television shows
Monarchy in fiction
2000s British television miniseries
Television series by All3Media